Neya is a town in Kostroma Oblast, Russia, located on the right bank of the Neya River (Unzha's tributary),  northeast of Kostroma, the administrative center of the oblast. Population:    14,400 (1970).

History
It was founded in 1906 and granted town status in 1958.

Administrative and municipal status
Within the framework of administrative divisions, Neya serves as the administrative center of Neysky District, even though it is not a part of it. As an administrative division, it is incorporated separately as the town of oblast significance of Neya—an administrative unit with a status equal to that of the districts. As a municipal division, the town of oblast significance of Neya is incorporated within Neysky Municipal District as Neya Urban Settlement.

References

Notes

Sources

Cities and towns in Kostroma Oblast